Scipione Spina (died 6 March 1639) was a Roman Catholic prelate who served as Bishop of Lecce (1591–1639).

Biography
On 10 May 1591, Scipione Spina  was appointed during the papacy of Pope Gregory XIV as Bishop of Lecce. On 3 June 1591, he was consecrated bishop by Giulio Antonio Santorio, Cardinal-Priest of San Bartolomeo all'Isola, with Flaminio Filonardi, Bishop of Aquino, and Leonard Abel, Titular Bishop of Sidon, serving as co-consecrators. He served as Bishop of Lecce until his death on 6 March 1639.

Episcopal succession

References

External links and additional sources
 (for Chronology of Bishops) 
 (for Chronology of Bishops) 

16th-century Italian Roman Catholic bishops
17th-century Italian Roman Catholic bishops
Bishops appointed by Pope Gregory XIV
1639 deaths